This article covers the telephone services in Turkey.

Authority
The political authority is Ministry of Transport, Maritime and Communication (Turkey) . But there is also a supreme council;  Information and Communication Technologies Authority (abbreviated BTK) which controls the internet and point to point telecommunication .

Land Telephone

Türk Telekom a private company issued from state owned Turkish PTT in 1995 is responsible in Turkish land phone. In 2013 the number of telephone subscriber is 13.86 million. International call code of Turkey is 90.

Mobile phone

Mobile phone service is provided by three private companies; Turkcell, Vodafone Turkey (former Telsim) and Avea (fused by Area and Aycell) . According to BTK figures in 2013, the number of subscribers is 35 million for Turkcell, 19,6 million for Vodafone, 14,1 million for Avea. The total number of subscribers is 68,9 million and penetration rate is 91.1 %.

International satellite and cable connections

Turkish satellite company is Türksat. Turkish satellites are also renamed Turksat.
Turksat 1B (launched in 1994) and Turksat 1C (launched in 1996) are outdated . 
Turksat 2A (launched in 2001) and Turksat 3A (launched in 2008) are active.
Turkey also uses connections via Eutelsat, Inmarsat and Intelsat satellites as well as cable and submarine cable systems for international connections.

Internet service providers

In addition to phone companies and Türksat, the following companies are also internet service providers: TTNET, Superonline, Uydunet, Turk.net, Millenicom, Pttcell, Pocell, Bimcell. The total number of internet users is 27, 3 million (2009 figures) Internet code of Turkey is ".tr".

References

Telecommunications in Turkey
Internet in Turkey